Arthur William Hall  (3 August 1880 – 18 April 1931) was a New Zealand politician of the Reform Party and a farmer.

Early life and interests
He was born in the Auckland suburb of One Tree Hill in 1880. He was the youngest son of Robert Hall of Remuera, who had been president of the Auckland A&P Association and chairman of the One Tree Hill Road Board. Hall Jr received his education at St John's College and then went farming at One Tree Hill, in the Waikato and then at Māngere. He settled in Papatoetoe in 1906 at the latest and had farms there and at East Tāmaki. His last residence in Papatoetoe was in St George Street.

A keen bowler, Hall chaired the Papatoetoe Bowling Club for two years during the 1910s.

Political career

He served on the inaugural Papatoetoe Town Board from May 1919. From his second term, he was chairman of the town board until he entered parliament (i.e. six years). He was the representative of the Auckland Suburban Local Bodies on the Railway Advisory Board.

He represented the Hauraki electorate from 1928 to 1931 when he died in office.

Family and death

Hall married Margaret Scott at her brother's residence at Paterangi (Waikato) on 18 April 1906.

He had an intracerebral hemorrhage on 16 April 1931 followed by emergency surgery in a Wellington hospital, but died in the early hours of 18 April at age 50. He was survived by his wife and their daughter. He was buried at Papatoetoe Presbyterian Cemetery, with the Hon. Arthur Stallworthy representing the prime minister at the funeral.

References

External links 
 Photo of Hall

1880 births
1931 deaths
People educated at St John's College, Auckland
Politicians from Auckland
Reform Party (New Zealand) MPs
Members of the New Zealand House of Representatives
New Zealand MPs for North Island electorates
20th-century New Zealand politicians
Local politicians in New Zealand
New Zealand male bowls players